Gotham is an American superhero crime-drama television series developed by Bruno Heller, based on characters appearing in and published by DC Comics in their Batman franchise, primarily those of James Gordon and Bruce Wayne. The series stars Ben McKenzie and David Mazouz respectively as the young Gordon and Wayne, while Heller executive produces along with Danny Cannon, who also directed the pilot. As originally conceived, the series would have served as a straightforward story of Gordon's early days at the Gotham City Police Department.

Series overview

Episodes

Season 1 (2014–15)

Season 2 (2015–16)

Season 3 (2016–17)

Season 4 (2017–18)

Season 5 (2019)

Ratings

References

External links

Lists of American action television series episodes
Lists of American crime drama television series episodes
Lists of DC Comics television series episodes